Scott Cross may refer to:

 Scott Cross (film director), American producer, actor, writer, and entrepreneur
 Scott Cross (footballer) (born 1987), English footballer
 Scott Cross (basketball) (born 1974), American college basketball coach